The Liga Argentina de Voleibol – Serie A1 (in English: Argentine Volleyball League – A1 Level) is the top level of the Argentine men's professional volleyball league system. It is organized by the Asociación de Clubes Liga Argentina de Voleibol (abbreviated to ACLAV). The Serie A1 has promotion and relegation with the Serie A2, the league immediately below.

The league was founded in 1996 under the name Liga Argentina de Clubes (in English: Argentine League of Clubs), and was organized by the Federación Argentina de Voleibol (Argentine Volleyball Federation). 12 teams participated in the first season of the league (the 1996–97), 7 from Buenos Aires (Vélez Sársfield, River Plate, Club de Amigos, Boca Juniors, G.E.B.A., Club Italiano, and Náutico Hacoaj) and 5 from the rest of the country (Mendoza de Regatas, Obras de San Juan, Unión Casildense, Luz y Fuerza de Necochea, and Peñarol de Mar del Plata). Peñarol won the first season, defeating Boca Juniors in the final. However, the club's players were unable to secure their unpaid salaries until 8 years later, when they did so through the judicial process.

Overall, Club Ciudad de Bolívar has been the most successful team. Bolívar joined the Liga Argentina de Voleibol for the 2002–03 season, supported by Argentine TV host and entrepreneur Marcelo Tinelli. Since then, the team has won 6 titles, including a run of four consecutive wins.

Current teams (2014–15 season)

Champions

References

External links
ACLAV official website 

1996 establishments in Argentina
Argentina
Sports leagues established in 1996
Professional sports leagues in Argentina
Volleyball in Argentina